Gavriil (Russian: Гавриил) was an  of the Russian Imperial Navy. The destroyer was built by the Russo-Baltic Yard at Reval (now Tallinn in Estonia), launching on 5 January 1915 and completing in October 1916. She served with the Baltic Fleet during the remainder of the First World War, and after the October Revolution joined the Bolshevik Red Fleet. She was active during the Russian Civil War, taking part in several engagements against British ships during the British campaign in the Baltic, and was sunk by a mine on 21 October 1919.

Design and construction
In 1912, the Russian State Duma passed a shipbuilding programme for the Imperial Russian Navy that envisioned the construction of four battlecruisers, eight cruisers, 36 destroyers and 18 submarines, mainly for the Baltic Fleet. An order for 22 destroyers to Putilov's design was placed with the three shipyards in December 1912.

Displacement was  normal.

The ships were originally designed to carry an armament of two  guns and four triple  torpedo tubes, but during construction, the Russian Naval Staff decided to strengthen the gun armament, replacing one set of torpedo tubes with two more 102 mm guns. One  anti-aircraft gun was fitted, while 50 mines could be carried. The ships had a crew of 150.

Gavriil was laid down on 8 December 1913 (24 November 1913 Old Style), at the Russo-Baltic Works Reval shipyard, was launched on 5 January 1915, and completed on 7 October 1916.

Service
Gavriil took part in the Battle of Moon Sound in October–November 1917. On hearing of the October Revolution after return to port, Gavriils crew sided with the Bolsheviks. Gavriil served with the Active Squadron of the Red Fleet in 1919, although fuel for operations was limited.

On 18 May 1919, Gavriil was escorting four minesweepers which had sortied from Kronstadt when the Russian force was spotted by the British cruiser , flagship of Rear Admiral Walter Cowan, commander of British naval forces in the Baltic. Cleopatra and the British destroyers ,  and  set out in pursuit of the Russian ships, while Gavriil engaged the British ships to allow the slower minesweepers to escape. Gavriil was damaged by near misses from the British ships, which were unharmed, as Gavriils guns did not have the range to reach the British, but the British broke off the engagement when they drew near Russian minefields and came under fire from Russian shore batteries.

A similar exchange of fire occurred on 4 June, between Gavriil and Azard on the Russian side and the destroyers , Vivacious and Walker, with the  providing distant support to the Russian destroyers. Shortly after this exchange of fire, the British submarine  attempted a torpedo attack against the two Russian destroyers, but broke surface after the attack and was hit by a shell from Gavriil and sunk (possibly after striking a mine) with all hands. On the evening of 9 June 1919, Gavriil and Azard attacked British ships watching Kronstadt, firing 80 shells at the British destroyers  Versatile, Vivacious and  before withdrawing. No ships on either side was damaged. On 13 June, the forts of Krasnaya Gorka and Grey Horse, on the South side of Petrograd Bay, revolted against the Bolsheviks, and from 16 June, units of the Red Fleet bombarded these forts. Gavriil supported these bombardment operations.

On the night of 17/18 August 1919, seven British Coastal Motor Boats (CMBs) attacked Kronstadt. Gavriil, which was anchored outside the entrance to Kronstadt harbour, was targeted by CMB24, but the British boat's torpedo ran too deep and passed underneath the Russian destroyer. Gavriils return fire quickly sank CMB24, but could not stop the remainder of the British force from entering the harbour, where they sank the submarine depot ship  and damaging the battleship . One CMB (CMB79) was sunk by a collision with CMB62. On leaving the harbour, CMB62 launched its torpedoes at Gavriil, but they too ran too deep and missed, and Gavrills gunfire sank CMB62.

Gavriil, leading the destroyers, was the first to strike a mine at 05:48 and sank after twenty minutes. Konstantin and Svoboda were sunk by mines within minutes, with only Azard, at the rear of the formation, escaping unharmed. Only 25 of the crew of the three sunken destroyers were rescued, with nineteen of those sailors from Gavriil who had escaped by boat, with 285 killed. Some sources state that this was an attempt to defect the four destroyers.

Notes

Citations

References

Further reading

Orfey-class destroyers
Destroyers of the Imperial Russian Navy
Ships built in Russia
1915 ships
World War I destroyers of Russia
Maritime incidents in 1919